XHBK-FM/XEBK-AM (branded as Exa FM) is an AM-FM combo radio station that serves the Laredo, Texas, United States and Nuevo Laredo, Tamaulipas, Mexico border area.

History
XEBK received its concession on March 10, 1936, though it had gone on the air November 20, 1935. It was owned by Gilberto Guajardo and Juan Manuel Cortés and broadcast on 1000 kHz. Francisco Javier Cortés Delgado became the concessionaire in 1957, and under his leadership, XEBK moved to 1340 and increased power to 500 watts day and 250 at night, later increased to 1,000 watts. In 1994, it became an FM combo, adding XHBK-FM 95.7. The current concessionaire took over the station in 2006.

On December 1, 2019, the Cortez family took over XHK-FM 90.9 and relocated the La Raza Regional Mexican format there. XHBK relaunched as "BK 95.7 FM" that same day.

XHBK flipped to Exa FM on December 11, 2020.

References

Spanish-language radio stations
Radio stations in Nuevo Laredo
1935 establishments in Mexico
Radio stations established in 1935